Maria Prevolaraki (born 21 December 1991 in Athens) is a Greek freestyle wrestler. She competed in the freestyle 55 kg event at the 2012 Summer Olympics and was eliminated by Yuliya Ratkevich in the 1/8 finals.

At the 2016 Summer Olympics in Rio de Janeiro, she advanced until the quarter finals, taking 10th place.

In 2020, she won the gold medal in the women's 53 kg event at the Individual Wrestling World Cup held in Belgrade, Serbia. In 2021, she was eliminated in her first match in the women's 53 kg event at the 2020 Summer Olympics held in Tokyo, Japan.

In February 2022, she won the gold medal in the 53 kg event at the Dan Kolov & Nikola Petrov Tournament held in Veliko Tarnovo, Bulgaria. In April 2022, she won the silver medal in the women's 53 kg event at the European Wrestling Championships held in Budapest, Hungary. A few months later, she won the gold medal in the 53 kg event at the 2022 Mediterranean Games held in Oran, Algeria. She won one of the bronze medals in the 53 kg event at the 2022 World Wrestling Championships held in Belgrade, Serbia.

References

External links
 

1991 births
Living people
Greek female sport wrestlers
Olympic wrestlers of Greece
Wrestlers at the 2012 Summer Olympics
Wrestlers at the 2016 Summer Olympics
Wrestlers at the 2020 Summer Olympics
Sportspeople from Athens
Mediterranean Games gold medalists for Greece
Mediterranean Games medalists in wrestling
Competitors at the 2013 Mediterranean Games
Competitors at the 2018 Mediterranean Games
Competitors at the 2022 Mediterranean Games
Wrestlers at the 2019 European Games
European Games competitors for Greece
World Wrestling Championships medalists
European Wrestling Championships medalists
21st-century Greek women